William B. Wood was a building contractor in Kentucky, active in the 1890s.

A number of his works are listed on the National Register of Historic Places.

Hausgen House, 1404 Walnut Lane Anchorage, KY (Wood William B.), NRHP-listed
Hillcrest, 11600 Owl Creek Rd. Anchorage, KY (Wood, William B.), NRHP-listed

John Marshall Sr. House, 12106 Osage Rd. Anchorage, KY (Wood, William B.), NRHP-listed
Middletown United Methodist Church, Madison and Main Sts. Middletown, KY (Wood, William, B.), NRHP-listed 
Shallcross, 11804 Ridge Rd. Anchorage, KY (Wood, William B.), NRHP-listed
James Thompson House, 1400 Walmut Land Anchorage, KY (Wood, William B.), NRHP-listed
Dr. Winston's House, 11906 Ridge Rd. Anchorage, KY (Wood, William B.), NRHP-listed

References

People from Kentucky
American businesspeople